Ballabio (Valassinese ) is a comune (municipality) in the Province of Lecco in the Italian region Lombardy, located about  northeast of Milan and about  north of Lecco in the Valsassina.

Historically, it has been a center for production of cheese, brands from the area including Galbani and Locatelli.

References

External links
Official website

Cities and towns in Lombardy
Valsassina